Chandra Prakash Choudhary (born 18 August 1967) is a member of Lok Sabha from Giridih constituency. He was member of Jharkhand Legislative Assembly elected from Ramgarh Vidhan Sabha constituency from 2005 to 2019, and he was a cabinet minister in Raghubar Das ministry of the portfolio of Water Resources, Drinking Water & Sanitation in Jharkhand.

He belongs to an OBC caste called Kurmi and hails from Sandi village located in Chitarpur block Of Ramgarh district.

References

1967 births
Living people
People from Ramgarh district
State cabinet ministers of Jharkhand
Lok Sabha members from Jharkhand
All Jharkhand Students Union politicians
Jharkhand MLAs 2005–2009
Jharkhand MLAs 2009–2014
Jharkhand MLAs 2014–2019
India MPs 2019–present